The 1984 Men's World Outdoor Bowls Championship was held at Westburn Park in Aberdeen, Scotland, from 11 to 28 July 1984.

Peter Belliss won the singles defeating Willie Wood in the final. Wood qualified for the final because he finished with a seven-shot advantage in section A over David Bryant despite identical records of winning nine rounds each.

United States won the pairs, Ireland won the triples and England won the fours.
The Leonard Trophy went to Scotland.

Medallists

Results

Men's singles – round robin
Section A

Section B

Bronze medal match
Bryant beat Williams 21–14.

Gold medal match
Belliss beat Wood 21–20.

Men's pairs – round robin
Section A

+ injury replacement
Section B

Bronze medal match
Australia beat Ireland 26–14.

Gold medal match
United States beat England 21–20.

Men's triples – round robin
Section A

Section B

Bronze medal match
New Zealand beat Hong Kong 27–8.

Gold medal match
Ireland beat Scotland 29–11.

Men's fours – round robin
Section A

Section B

Bronze medal match
Scotland beat Hong Kong 30–15.

Gold medal match
England beat New Zealand 18–17.

W.M.Leonard Trophy

References

World Outdoor Bowls Championship
1984 in bowls
1984 in Scottish sport
July 1984 sports events in the United Kingdom